David Peters may refer to:
 David M. Peters Jr. (1911–1956), American politician
 David Peters (politician) (born 1954), American politician
 David Peters (professor), British professor of integrated healthcare at the University of Westminster
 David Peters (poker player) (born 1987), American poker player
 David Peters (paleoartist) (born 1954), American paleoartist